Loxodonta Africana is the debut album led by saxophonist Ricky Ford which was recorded in 1977 and released on the New World label.

Reception

The AllMusic review by Scott Yanow stated "Tenor saxophonist Ricky Ford's first record as a leader preceded the beginning of his highly rated string of Muse albums by a year. 23 at the time, Ford already had a recognizable sound that was influenced by Dexter Gordon. For this ambitious effort (which displayed the impact of his stint with Charles Mingus), Ford performs five of his original". Reviewing the reissued album in JazzTimes Willard Jenkins wrote "While there is ample evidence that Ricky Ford’s palette has broadened, and his sound has ripened notably over these twenty years, he has yet to craft a recording that tops this one".

Track listing
All compositions by Ricky Ford except where noted
 "Loxodonta Africana" – 4:42
 "Ucil" – 5:13
 "Blues Peru" – 5:00
 "Dexter" – 5:43
 "My Romance" (Richard Rodgers, Lorenz Hart) – 8:30
 "One Up, One Down" (John Coltrane) – 4:24
 "Aerolinos" – 6:54

Personnel
Ricky Ford - tenor saxophone
Oliver Breener, Charles Sullivan – trumpet (tracks 1-4, 6 & 7)
Janice Robinson – trombone (tracks 2 & 6)
Jonathan Dorn – tuba (tracks 2 & 6)
James Spaulding - alto saxophone (tracks 2 & 6)
Bob Neloms – piano 
Richard Davis – bass 
Dannie Richmond – drums

References

New World Records albums
Ricky Ford albums
1977 albums
Albums recorded at Van Gelder Studio
Albums produced by Michael Cuscuna